James Dugald "Jimmy" McPartland (March 15, 1907 – March 13, 1991) was an American cornetist. He worked with Eddie Condon, Art Hodes, Gene Krupa, Benny Goodman, Jack Teagarden, and Tommy Dorsey, often leading his own bands. He was married to pianist Marian McPartland.

Music career

Austin High School Gang
McPartland was born in Chicago, Illinois. His father was a music teacher and baseball player. He and his siblings for some time lived in orphanages. After being removed from one orphanage for fighting, he got in further trouble with the law. He credited music with turning him around; he started violin at age five, and took up the cornet at age 15.

McPartland was a member of the Austin High School Gang, with Bud Freeman (tenor sax), Frank Teschemacher (clarinet), his brother Dick McPartland (banjo/guitar), brother-in-law Jim Lanigan (bass, tuba and violin), Joe Sullivan (piano), and Dave Tough (drums) in the 1920s. They were inspired by the recordings they heard at the local malt shop, the Spoon and Straw. They studied and tried to duplicate what they heard on recordings by the New Orleans Rhythm Kings and others, and would frequently visit Louis Armstrong, who was a few years their senior, and King Oliver's Creole Jazz Band.

New York City bands
After playing through high school, their first musical job was under the name the Blue Friars. In 1924, at age 17, McPartland went to New York City to take Bix Beiderbecke's place in the Wolverines band. Beiderbecke sat at the back of the club during the audition. They became friends and roomed together. At that time, Beiderbecke picked out the cornet for McPartland that he played throughout his career.

From 1926-27, he worked with Art Kassel. Also in 1927, he was a part of the McKenzie-Condon's Chicagoans recording session that produced "China Boy" and "Nobody's Sweetheart". Finally, in 1927, he joined Ben Pollack's band for two years, and was one of the main soloists (with Benny Goodman, Bud Freeman, Jack Teagarden and Glenn Miller). McPartland played on the 1928 recording of "Room 1411". He also moonlighted in Broadway pit bands. McPartland then went to New York City, and played with a number of small combos. He co-wrote the song "Makin' Friends" with Jack Teagarden.

In 1930, McPartland moved back to Chicago, working with his brother Dick, in a group called the Embassy Four. He was then a bandleader, singer, and master-of-ceremonies at the Three Deuces nightclub. He worked with Russ Columbo (1931–1932) and the Harry Reser band (1933–1935).

During this period, he married singer Dorothy Williams, who along with her sister, Hannah (who later married boxer Jack Dempsey), performed as the Williams Sisters, and they had a daughter, Dorothy. They soon divorced and McPartland spent time in South America.

Meeting Marian
During 1936–1941, McPartland led his own bands and joined Teagarden's Big Band until he was drafted into the army during World War II (1942–1944). After participating in the invasion of Normandy, he met his future wife in Belgium, the English pianist Margaret Marian Turner, who became better known as jazz pianist Marian McPartland. They married in Aachen, Germany and moved back to Chicago, where McPartland appeared on Windy City Jamboree, before settling in New York City. Soon, he was part of the Willie 'The Lion' Smith band with Jimmy Archey, Pee Wee Russell, George 'Pops' Foster, and George Wettling. The band won a Grammy Award for the soundtrack to the 1954 film, After Hours.

McPartland encouraged Marian to develop her own style and form her own group, which led to the establishment of her long residency at the Hickory House, with a trio including drummer Joe Morello. In 1948, he and Marian performed at the Brass Rail in Chicago. The stage was so small it barely held the trio, but they grew a large following.

TV work and late career
McPartland's outgoing personality and stage presence led him to try acting, resulting in a featured role in The Alcoa Hour episode "The Magic Horn" in 1956 with Sal Mineo, Ralph Meeker, and other jazz musicians. He later performed in a production of Show Boat. In 1961, he appeared on a DuPont Show of the Month musical extravaganza called Chicago and All That Jazz, featuring Gene Krupa, Jack Teagarden, Eddie Condon, Pee Wee Russell, and Lil Armstrong.

McPartland performed as guest star with many bands and at festivals during the 1970s in the US and out of the country. The McPartlands divorced in 1970. They continued to work together, remained friends, and remarried a few weeks before Jimmy's death. 

He died of lung cancer in Port Washington, New York, in 1991, two days before his 84th birthday.

Honors
In 1992, Jimmy McPartland was inducted into the Big Band and Jazz Hall of Fame.

Discography

As leader
 After Hours (Grand Award, 1956)
 Dixieland Now and Then (Jazztone, 1956)
 The Middle Road (Jazztone, 1956)
 The Music Man Goes Dixieland (Epic, 1958)
 Play TV Themes with Marian McPartland (Design, 1960)
 That Happy Dixieland Jazz (RCA, 1960)
 Meet Me in Chicago with Art Hodes (Mercury, 1960)
 Dixieland! (Harmony, 1968)
 The McPartlands Live at the Monticello with Marian McPartland (Halcyon, 1972)
 Swingin (Halcyon, 1973)
 Wanted! (Improv, 1977)
 Tony Bennett/The McPartlands and Friends Make Magnificent Music (Improv, 1977)
 One Night Stand (Jazzology, 1986)
 On Stage (Jazzology, 2001)
 Jazzmeeting in Holland with Bud Freeman, Ted Easton (Circle, 2003)
 Chicagoans Live in Concert (Jazzology, 2006)

As sideman
 Bix Beiderbecke, Bix Beiderbecke and the Chicago Cornets (Milestone, 1992)
 Ben Pollack, Futuristic Rhythm (Halcyon, 1988)
 George Wein, The Magic Horn (RCA Victor, 1956)
 Jack Teagarden, King of the Blues Trombone (Epic, 1963)

References

External links
 Austin High Gang at the Red Hot Jazz Archive
 Jimmy McPartland at the Red Hot Jazz Archive
 Jimmy McPartland recordings at the Discography of American Historical Recordings
 Guide to the Jimmy and Marian McPartland Collection 1923-1990 at the University of Chicago Special Collections Research Center

1907 births
1991 deaths
Dixieland jazz musicians
Gennett Records artists
Deaths from lung cancer
American jazz cornetists
The Wolverines (jazz band) members